E! Hollywood Hold'em is a poker television program. It aired in 2005 on the E! television network. The show featured young celebrities (including co-executive producer Laura Prepon and brothers Chris and Danny Masterson) hosting single table Texas hold em tournaments at their homes. The winner of each tournament pocketed $10,000. Professional poker player Phil Laak served as host and dealer, offering occasional tips to the players and home viewers.

External links
 Official Website
 

Television shows about poker
Poker in North America
E! original programming
2005 American television series debuts
2005 American television series endings
English-language television shows